Hasri Ainun Habibie ( Besari; 11 August 1937 – 22 May 2010) was an Indonesian physician and wife of former President B. J. Habibie. She served as First Lady of Indonesia from 1998 to 1999.

Early life
Ainun was born on 11 August 1937 in Semarang to R. Mohamad Besari, a lecturer, and his wife Sadarmi Besari, a midwife, whose family is known as well-educated and intellectual.

She and her siblings studied at Dago Christian Junior College. Her eldest brother, Sahari, graduated from junior college when he was in sophomore year and continued his education at Bandung Institute of Technology. Ainun continued her education in the Medical Faculty of University of Indonesia and graduated in 1961.

Marriage
Ainun first met B. J. "Rudy" Habibie when they were studying in secondary school. They were schoolmates when studying in Dago Christian Junior College. Their families had known each other for a long time and often visited each other.

In 1962, Rudy and Ainun met again. They fell in love and wed on May 12, 1962. Their honeymoon took place in Yogyakarta, Bali, and Ujung Pandang. Rudy's three-month holiday in Indonesia soon ended and they moved to Aachen, where Rudy worked. The couple had two children.

Career
In 1978, Suharto appointed the 42-year-old B. J. Habibie to be his Minister of Research and Technology in his third cabinet. As the wife of a member of the cabinet, Ainun joined the Dharma Wanita organization under the leadership of First Lady Siti Hartinah. Ainun led her husband's ministry's Dharma Wanita and consolidating non-department organization with Madame Soedharmono, wife of Soedharmono, Secretary of State.

On April 26, 1978, First Lady Tien Soeharto, Second Lady Nelly Adam Malik, and Mrs Soehartati Oemar Senoadji founded Yayasan Karya Bhakti RIA Pembangunan or simply as YKBRP, whose organization from 1998 until 1999, Ainun became its chairperson, and until her death, she still remains its chairwoman. Ainun was chairwoman of PPMTI from 2000 until her death in 2010.

Second Lady of Indonesia (1998)
In 1996, First Lady Siti Hartinah died and her eldest daughter Tutut was appointed to replace her as acting First Lady.

Suharto appointed Habibie as his second-in-command in 1998, and the parliament elected them as president and vice-president. Ainun thus became Second Lady and leader of Dharma Wanita (held by a First Lady, but there was no First Lady at the time, because First Lady Siti Hartinah had died). She later becomes its official leader in May 1998.

First lady (1998–1999)
Suharto was on a state visit to Cairo when demonstrators stormed the House of Representatives' office buildings. Suharto quickly returned to Indonesia and resigned his position as president, leaving the position to Habibie. Ainun thus became first lady. Ainun became chairperson of all organizations associated with the first lady, including Dharma Wanita and YKBRP. In 1999, the parliament declined to accept Habibie's presidential responsibility speech and elected Abdurrahman Wahid as the next president.

Death
In January 2010, Ainun was admitted to the Ludwig Maximilians-Universität Hospital in Munich, Germany for intensive care for her ovarian cancer. After several operations, she died on May 22 in the same year. Her body was sent back to Jakarta and buried in the Kalibata National Heroes Cemetery on May 25 in a military funeral ceremony conducted by President Susilo Bambang Yudhoyono.

Honours
  Star of the Republic of Indonesia, 2nd Class (6 August 1998)
  Star of Mahaputera, 1st Class (28 May 1998)
  Star of Mahaputera, 3rd Class (12 August 1992)

A monument called Monumen Cinta Sejati Habibie Ainun (Habibie Ainun True Love Monument) in B.J. Habibie's hometown of Parepare, South Sulawesi, featuring statue of B.J. Habibie and Hasri Ainun, was dedicated by B.J. Habibie at their 53rd wedding anniversary in 2015. A number of health facilities are named after her, such as dr. Hasri Ainun Habibie Regional Hospital in Parepare, dr. Hasri Ainun Habibie Regional General Hospital in Gorontalo city, Gorontalo, and dr. Hasri Ainun Habibie Eye Clinic in Bogor, West Java.

In popular culture
Ainun was portrayed by actress Bunga Citra Lestari in the 2012 film Habibie & Ainun, based on the novel with the same title with the film by her husband, B. J. Habibie. It was published in 2010. The novel contains his 48 years married life with Ainun.

A traditional comedy opera series by Trans7 channel, Opera van Java, had their 2009 episode Hadidi dan Mainun where Ainun was portrayed by comedian Nunung.

In 2016, she made a cameo (portrayed by someone) in the 2016 film Rudy Habibie, a prequel to the 2012 film.

In the movie Habibie & Ainun 3 (2019), she was portrayed by Maudy Ayunda.

References

|-

|-

1937 births
2010 deaths
20th-century Indonesian physicians
Indonesian Muslims
Hasri
People from Semarang
First ladies and gentlemen of Indonesia
German people of Indonesian descent
Javanese people
Naturalized citizens of Germany
University of Indonesia alumni
Deaths from ovarian cancer
Deaths from cancer in Germany